Danila Anatolyevich Sokirchenko (born 15 October 1996) is a Kyrgyz professional footballer who plays as a midfielder for Dordoi Bishkek, and the Kyrgyzstan national team.

Club career
On 1 August 2022, Dordoi Bishkek announced the signing of Sokirchenko on a contract until the end of the year.

Career statistics

International

References

1995 births
Living people
Kyrgyzstani footballers
Kyrgyzstan international footballers
Association football defenders
FC Dordoi Bishkek players